Li Shaogeng (Hepburn: Ri Shōkō; b. 1896), was a politician in the early Republic of China who subsequently served in a number of cabinet posts of the Empire of Manchuria.

Biography
A native of Liaoyang Liaoning Province,  Li graduated from the Harbin Higher Commercial School. He  subsequently served in local government, and various posts under Fengtian clique warlord, Zhang Zuolin. He was also sent as envoy from Manchuria to Vladivostok from March–September 1927. In 1931, he became a director of the Chinese Eastern Railway.

Following the establishment of Manchukuo, Li continued to work for the Chinese Eastern Railway, rising to the post of Chairman of the Board of Directors and President. In March 1935 he accepted the post of Minister of Transportation for the Empire of Manchuria – a post which he held to December 1942. From September 1942 to April 1944, Li also held the post of Foreign Minister of Manchukuo. In April 1945, Li was appointed as special envoy to the Wang Jingwei Government.

Following the Soviet invasion of Manchuria, Li went into hiding. His subsequent fate is unknown.

References

External links

Officials of Manchukuo (Japanese)

Government ministers of Manchukuo
Republic of China politicians from Liaoning
Chinese collaborators with Imperial Japan
1896 births
Date of death unknown
Politicians from Liaoyang
Diplomats of Manchukuo